Jagarlamudi may be:

 Jagarlamudi Kuppuswamy Chowdary College, is an educational institution in Guntur of the Indian state of Andhra Pradesh. 
 Sangam Jagarlamudi, is a village in Guntur district of the Indian state of Andhra Pradesh. 
 Sangam Jagarlamudi railway station, is an Indian railway station in Sangam Jagarlamudi of Andhra Pradesh. 
 Radhakrishna Jagarlamudi is better known as Krish (director), is an Indian film director.